In the Beginning There Was Underwear is a 1999 Italian romantic comedy film written and directed by Anna Negri. It was screened in the "Forum" section at the 49th Berlin International Film Festival.

Cast 

Teresa Saponangelo: Imma 
Stefania Rocca: Teresa 
Bebo Storti: Michele 
Filippo Timi: Tasca 
Monica Scattini: Lady Driver 
Pao Pei Andreoli: Marco

References

External links

1999 films
Italian romantic comedy films
1999 romantic comedy films
1999 directorial debut films
Films scored by Dominik Scherrer
1990s Italian films